The Detroit Festival of the Arts was a three-day arts festival in Detroit, Michigan, held on the second weekend of June. First held in 1986, the Festival featured free musical performances, art showings, activities for children, and local food. It was located in Detroit's cultural center, spanning the Detroit Institute of Arts, the main branch of the Detroit Public Library, and the main Wayne State University campus. A giant sand sculpture had been a fixture of the event since 2004. The theme of the sand sculpture was selected by the sponsors and not by the artists. Official sponsors for the 2007 Festival included DaimlerChrysler, Macy's and the Metro Times.

In 2009, the University Cultural Center Association and Wayne State University produced a new event called "Midsummer Nights in Midtown," which took place every Thursday, Friday, and Saturday in the month of June that year.

See also
Art on the Move

References

1986 establishments in Michigan
2009 disestablishments in Michigan
Music festivals in Detroit
Arts festivals in the United States
Tourist attractions in Detroit